Jonathan Dean (born May 15, 1997) is an American soccer player who plays for Chicago Fire in Major League Soccer.

Career

Youth and college 
Dean played high school soccer at the Stratford Academy, where he won regional and state championships in 2012 and 2013. He also spent time with the USSDA side Georgia United prior to attending college.

Dean began playing college soccer at Wofford College in 2015, making 17 appearances, scoring 1 goal and tallying 5 assists. In 2016, Dean transferred to the University of Central Florida. Here he made 50 appearances, scoring 1 goal and tallying 11 assists. Here in his final year he captained them to a Conference Championship as well as an appearance in the Sweet 16 in the NCAA tournament.

Professional 
On January 9, 2020, Dean was selected 39th overall in the 2020 MLS SuperDraft by Orlando City. However, he was released by the club on February 24, 2020.

Dean signed his first professional contract with USL Championship side Birmingham Legion on February 29, 2020. He made his debut on July 15, 2020, starting in a 3-0 win over Memphis 901.

On January 12, 2023, Dean signed with Major League Soccer side Chicago Fire on a one-year deal.

Honors
Individual
USL Championship All League Second Team: 2022

References

External links 
 Jonathan Dean - Men's Soccer Wofford bio
 Jonathan Dean - 2019 - (M) Soccer UCF bio
 Jonathan Dean | uslchampionship.com USL Championship bio
 Jonathan Dean Birmingham Legion bio
 

1997 births
Living people
Soccer players from Georgia (U.S. state)
Sportspeople from Macon, Georgia
American soccer players
Association football defenders
Birmingham Legion FC players
Chicago Fire FC players
Orlando City SC draft picks
UCF Knights men's soccer players
USL Championship players